A Fight to the Finish is a 1937 American drama film, directed by Charles C. Coleman. It stars Don Terry, Rosalind Keith, and Ward Bond.

References

External links
A Fight to the Finish at the Internet Movie Database

1937 films
American drama films
1937 drama films
Films directed by Charles C. Coleman
American black-and-white films
Columbia Pictures films
1930s American films